Wardhanapet Assembly constituency is a SC reserved constituency of Telangana Legislative Assembly, India. It is one among 12 constituencies in Warangal district. It covers the suburbs of the City of Warangal and part of Warangal Lok Sabha constituency.

Aroori Ramesh of Telangana Rashtra Samithi won the seat with over 86,000 majority in 2014 Telangana Assembly Elections.

Mandals
The Assembly Constituency presently comprises the following Mandals:

Members of Legislative Assembly

Election results

Telangana Legislative Assembly election, 2018

Telangana Legislative Assembly election, 2014

See also
Warangal West (Assembly constituency)
Warangal East (Assembly constituency)
 List of constituencies of Telangana Legislative Assembly

References

Assembly constituencies of Telangana
Hanamkonda district
Constituencies established in 1952
1952 establishments in India